The National Organization of Trade Unions (NOTU) is the largest national trade union center in Uganda with 25 affiliated unions representing 935,000 workers in 2018.

Affiliates and membership

References

Trade unions in Uganda
International Trade Union Confederation
Trade unions established in 1973